Mycenella is a genus of fungi in the family Tricholomataceae. The widespread genus contains 10 species, found mostly in temperate regions. Mycologist Rolf Singer circumscribed the genus in 1938.

See also

List of Tricholomataceae genera

References

Tricholomataceae
Agaricales genera